Alliance Group Limited, a cooperative originally named Alliance Freezing Company (Southland) Limited, operates freezing works at eight sites in New Zealand and exports grass-fed meat and by-products to Europe, North America, as well as Asia including China, India, Korea and Japan and many other countries. Alliance employs almost 5,000 people across New Zealand and operates two processing plants in the North Island and six in the South Island.

Brands
Pure South – the company's overarching brand for lamb, beef and venison
Lumina Lamb – high country lamb
Silere – alpine origin merino lamb
Handpicked – beef and venison
Ashley – for sheepmeat exported to Europe

Corporate profile
The corporate identity was changed to Alliance in 2018.

David Surveyor has since January 2015 been the chief executive officer, succeeding Grant Cuff. Murray Taggart has been chairman of the board of directors since 1 October 2013.

History
Alliance Freezing Company (Southland) Limited was founded by local farmers in Invercargill in 1948. Their first large freezing works was opened in 1980 at Lorneville on the outskirts of Invercargill. 

From its base in Invercargill Alliance runs freezing works nearby in Southland at Lorneville and Mataura, further away at Pukeuri in Otago, Timaru in South Canterbury, and at Nelson. There are two freezing works in the North Island at Dannevirke and Levin. A new $15.9 million venison plant opened at Lorneville in December 2018.

Always a business belonging to farmers Alliance's ownership model was changed in 1960 to a cooperative. The farmers who supply the livestock to be killed are the company's shareholders. The name of the cooperative was changed to Alliance Group Limited in 1990.

Alliance Group bought their first North Island freezing works at Dannevirke in 2003. They added a second North Island works at Levin in 2008.

References

Meat processing in New Zealand
Food manufacturers of New Zealand
Agricultural cooperatives
Agriculture companies of New Zealand
Cooperatives in New Zealand
New Zealand companies established in 1948
Agriculture companies established in 1948